Italy competed at the 1976 European Athletics Indoor Championships in Munich, West Germany, from 21 to 22 February 1976.

Medalists

Top eight
Three Italian athletes reached the top eight in this edition of the championships.
Men

Women
In this edition of the championships, no Italian woman reached the top eight.

See also
 Italy national athletics team

References

External links
 EAA official site 

1976
1976 European Athletics Indoor Championships
1976 in Italian sport